Gervaise may refer to:

People
 Gervaise of Bazoches (died 1108), crusader and Prince of Galilee
 Gervaise Cooke (1911–1976), British Royal Navy officer and Naval Secretary
 Claude Gervaise (1525–1583), French composer, editor and arranger
 François Armand Gervaise (1660–1761), French Discalced Carmelite and historian
 Isaac Gervaise (c. 1680–1739), English merchant and economist
 Tony Gervaise (born 1955), Scottish association football player and coach

Other uses
 Gervaise (film), 1956 French film directed by René Clément
 Gervaise Macquart, 1995 opera by Giselher Klebe
 Cyclone Gervaise, a 1975 South-West Indian Ocean cyclone

See also
 Gervais (disambiguation)
 Gervase (disambiguation)